Bahrain Airport Company (BAC) is the operator and managing body of Bahrain International Airport (BIA). The company's premises are located at Airport Avenue, Muharraq. The company is fully owned by Mumtalakat and falls under the Gulf Air Group Holding Company. The current CEO of the company is Mohamed Yousif AlBinfalah.

History
Bahrain Airport Company was established in 2008, the semi-governmental company is responsible for developing BIA and enhancing its capacity and infrastructure to accommodate future growth. Under the company, the airport was awarded the Best Middle East Airport award at the Skytrax World Airport Awards in 2010.

References

External links

Airports in Bahrain
Airport operators
Bahraini companies established in 2008